General elections were held in Palau on 2 November 2004, alongside several referendums. The presidential election was won comfortably by the incumbent, Tommy Remengesau, who took almost two-thirds of the vote, whilst all House of Delegates and Senate seats were won by non-partisan independents.

Results

President

Senate

House of Delegates

References

2004 elections in Oceania
General election
Election and referendum articles with incomplete results
Elections in Palau
Non-partisan elections
2004 election
2004